Education University may refer to:
 Hemwati Nandan Bahuguna Uttarakhand Medical Education University
 Education University of Hong Kong
 Kabul Education University of Rabbani
 University of Education (Pakistan)
 Seoul National University of Education
 Sultan Idris Education University
 Tamil Nadu Teachers Education University
 World Islamic Sciences and Education University